"Step Into My Office, Baby" is a song by Belle & Sebastian, released as their first single for Rough Trade Records in 2003. The track was produced by Trevor Horn and is lifted from Dear Catastrophe Waitress—the first of the band's singles or EPs to also feature on an album. The front cover features band member Bobby Kildea with Roxanne Clifford (later of Veronica Falls) and Hannah Robinson. The track reached number 32 on the  UK Singles Chart, number 80 in the Netherlands, and came in at number 64 on Australia's Triple J Hottest 100 in 2003.

The single release also features Love on the March, which the band recorded with Divine Comedy producer Darren Allison.

Reception
Spin said the song, "swaggers into the party like a drunken junior accountant in a Hermits T-shirt, slinging British-invasion guitar twang, Swingin' Sixties orchestral charts, and hostile-work environment double entendres ("I'm pushin' for a raise")".

Track listings
CD
 "Step into My Office, Baby" – 4:14
 "Love on the March" – 3:49
 "Desperation Made a Fool of Me" – 4:15
 "Step into My Office, Baby" (video)

7-inch vinyl
 "Step into My Office, Baby" – 4:14
 "Love on the March" – 3:49

DVD
 "Step into My Office, Baby" (video)
 "Love on the March" (audio and photo gallery)
 "Desperation Made a Fool of Me" (audio)

Charts

References

External links
 "Step Into My Office, Baby" at belleandsebastian.com

Belle and Sebastian songs
2003 singles
2003 songs
Rough Trade Records singles
Song recordings produced by Trevor Horn